Russell DeGrazier is an American writer, director, producer and actor. DeGrazier received a master's degree in film from the USC School of Cinematic Arts. His works include the comedy-drama Sunset Strip and the short film 'Mad' Boy, I'll Blow Your Blues Away. Be Mine. He appeared in a reoccurring role in the series Friday Night Lights. He also appeared in an episode of the short-lived NBC series, Chase.

Filmography

Acting

Directing

Writing

References

External links

 Russell DeGrazier Interview

1967 births
American male actors
American film directors
American film producers
American male screenwriters
Southern Methodist University alumni
University of Southern California alumni
Living people